Dead Island 2 is an upcoming action role-playing game developed by Dambuster Studios and published by Deep Silver. It is a sequel to the 2011 video game Dead Island and the third major installment in the Dead Island series. Set roughly a couple months after the events of Dead Island and Dead Island: Riptide, Dead Island 2 differentiates itself from its predecessors by taking place in the city of Los Angeles, which has been quarantined due to the zombie outbreak. The game is scheduled to be released on April 21, 2023, for PlayStation 4, PlayStation 5, Windows, Xbox One, and Xbox Series X/S.

Announced in 2014, the game has undergone a difficult development period due to multiple changes with the studios working on it. Yager Development was originally hired to develop Dead Island 2 in 2012, but was removed from the project in 2015 and replaced by Sumo Digital the following year. Sumo Digital was also removed, with Dambuster, an internal studio of Deep Silver, becoming the developers in 2019.

Gameplay
Dead Island 2 takes place in an open-world Los Angeles and San Francisco. The game's combat has different mechanics than its predecessors. Dead Island 2 also includes several features from its predecessors, such as the "rage" and crafting systems.

Plot
About 10 years after the events of Dead Island, the United States government and US military are forced to put California under a full quarantine restricted zone due to a new and stronger zombie outbreak.

Development
Techland was originally set to develop Dead Island 2, but instead they decided to focus on developing Dying Light with Warner Bros. Interactive Entertainment. Deep Silver went looking for a developer until Yager Development pitched the game to Deep Silver in Q3 2012 and got the deal. Yager established a new division, Yager Productions GmbH, for development of Dead Island 2. As announced at Sony's E3 2014 media briefing, Dead Island 2 will be more vibrant than its predecessors. The game was originally scheduled for a Q2 2015 release.

At Gamescom 2014, Deep Silver demonstrated gameplay footage from an early version of the game. According to the presented content, the game is set in California, including landmarks such as the Santa Monica Pier and Hollywood, as well as many locations in San Francisco. Similarly, only a fraction of the weapon modifications and the new zombies have been shown at the stage. Furthermore, Deep Silver stated that the game will feature four playable characters, though only two were shown at the Gamescom Demo. It will also feature eight-player cooperative multiplayer.

In July 2015, Deep Silver announced that Yager has been dropped from developing the game and development would be moved to another unnamed developer. The managing director of Yager Development, Timo Ullmann, later stated that the company's departure from the project occurred because "Yager and Deep Silver's respective visions of the project fell out of alignment". Yager Productions filed for insolvency in July 2015.

In March 2016, UK-based studio Sumo Digital announced that it had taken over the development. In August 2017, Deep Silver reiterated that the game was still in development, making a similar statement again in July 2018. In August 2019, THQ Nordic announced that development of the game had changed hands to Dambuster Studios, an internal studio of Deep Silver.

A 2015 playable version of the still-under-development game while at Yager was leaked in June 2020.

The game was shown at Gamescom 2022, where the February 3, 2023, release date was announced. In November 2022, it was announced that the game would be delayed until April 28, 2023, to allow additional development time. In February 2023, the release date was moved to a week earlier on April 21.

In popular culture 
In 2022, a trailer for Goat Simulator 3 used elements from an early Dead Island 2 trailer as a bait-and-switch before revealing the titular goats.

Notes

References

Action role-playing video games
Cancelled Stadia games
Deep Silver games
Multiplayer and single-player video games
Open-world video games
PlayStation 4 Pro enhanced games
PlayStation 4 games
PlayStation 5 games
Post-apocalyptic video games
Unreal Engine games
Upcoming video games scheduled for 2023
Vaporware video games
Video game sequels
Video games about zombies
Video games developed in the United Kingdom
Video games featuring black protagonists
Video games featuring female protagonists
Video games set in 2006
Video games set in California
Video games set in Los Angeles
Video games set in San Francisco
Windows games
Xbox One X enhanced games
Xbox One games
Xbox Series X and Series S games